Christophe Louis-Pascal Bertrand (24 April 1981 – 17 September 2010) was a French composer of contemporary classical music.

Biography 
Bertrand, born in Wissembourg, was a French pianist and composer of mainly chamber works born in 1981. After earning gold medals for piano and chamber music at the Conservatoire de Strasbourg, he performed and recorded with the Ensemble "Accroche-Note" and the Ensemble "In Extremis" of which he was a co-founder. He collaborated with composers such as Ivan Fedele and Pascal Dusapin.

He studied composition since 1996, under the supervision of Ivan Fedele at the Strasbourg Conservatoire, obtaining with distinction his diploma in 2000.

His compositions, conducted among others by Pierre Boulez, Jonathan Nott, Hannu Lintu, Marc Albrecht have been performed by several ensembles and soloists such as the Ensemble Intercontemporain, Arditti Quartet and the Orchestre philharmonique de Strasbourg.

His compositions have been played internationally, amongst others in:

 France: Festival Musica, IRCAM, Festival d'Aix-en-Provence, Festival Agora, Centre Georges Pompidou, Salle Olivier Messiaen de la Maison de Radio France, etc.
 Germany: Beethovenfest Bonn, Ultraschall-Festival à Berlin, Internationale Ferienkurse in Darmstadt, Mitteldeutscher Rundfunk
 Switzerland: Lucerne Festival
 Belgium: Ars Musica in Brussels
 Italy: Festival Traiettorie in Parma, Rondo-Milano, Spoleto Festival
 The Netherlands: Gaudeamus Festival in Amsterdam
 The USA (San Francisco), in the United Kingdom (Manchester), in Slovenia (Ljubljana) 
French radio channel France Musique provided his compositions airtime (broadcasting).

He died by suicide in September 2010 in Strasbourg, where he also lived.

Awards
Christophe Bertrand was awarded several awards for 
 Prix de la Musique de l'Académie des Marches de l'Est (2001) 
 Earplay Prize (2002)
 SACEM Hervé Dugardin prize (2007)
 André Caplet prize (2007)

He was selected by the Académie française in Rome to be in residence at the Villa Médicis in Rome for 18 months.

Works
Quatuor II

(2010)

String quartet (11')

Okhtor

(2010)

Large orchestra (13')

Ayas

(2010)

Brass and percussion (2')

Scales

(2008-2009)

Large ensemble (20')

Haïku

(2008)

Piano (5')

Satka

(2008)

Ensemble (13')

Dall'Inferno

(2008)

Flute, viola and harp (10')

Hendeka

(2007)

Piano trio (13')u

Arashi (2007)

solo clarinet (6')
To Thomas Monod

World premiere : 29/02/2008 - Strasbourg, Mamcs - Thomas Monod

Vertigo (2006–2007)

2 pianos and orchestra (20')

Co-commissioned by French Ministry of Culture and Musica Festival

World premiere: Musica Festival 2008

Sanh (2006)

bass clarinet, cello and piano (11')

Commissioned by French Ministry of Culture to Armand Angster

World premiere : 11/10/2007 - Strasbourg, Musica Festival / Accroche-Note

Quatuor I (2005–2006)

string quartet (20')

Co-commissioned by Beethovenfest of Bonn and Peter McBurney
To the Arditti Quartet

World premiere: 19/03/2006 - Brussels, Ars Musica Festival - Arditti Quartet
French premiere: 20/07/2006 - Festival d'Aix-en-Provence - Arditti Quartet
World premiere of first version: 24/09/2005 - Kunstmuseum Bonn - Mandelring Quartett

Mana (2004–2005)

large orchestra (10')

Commissioned by Lucerne Festival
To Pierre Boulez

World premiere: 09/09/2005 - Lucerne KKL - Lucerne Festival Academy Orchestra, dir. Pierre Boulez
French premiere: 02/062006 - Orchestre Philharmonique de Radio-France, dir. Hannu Lintu

Madrigal (2004–2005)
female voice and ensemble (11')

Commissioned by the André Boucourechliev Foundation to Françoise Kubler and Armand Angster

World premiere: 30 September 2005 - Strasbourg, Festival Musica - Accroche-Note

Virya (2004)

flûte, clarinet (+ bass clarinet), percussions and piano (7')

Commissioned by Francis Rueff
To Frédéric Kahn

World premiere: 19/03/2004 - Espace 110 Illzach - Ensemble In Extremis

Aus (2004)

viola, soprano saxophone, clarinet (+ bass clarinet) and piano (8')

Commissioned b Radio Berlin-Brandeburg
To Philippe Hurel

World premiere: 24/01/2004 - Berlin, Ultraschall-Festival - Ensemble Intégrales
Recording: CD "European Young generation" by Ensemble Intégrales Zeitklang Editions (ez-21019)

Haos (2003)

solo piano (10')

Commissioned by Festival Rendez-vous Musique Nouvelle, Forbach to Laurent Cabasso

World premiere: 09/11/2003 - Forbach, Festival RVMN - Raoul Jehl, piano

Iôa (2003)

8-part female choir (3')
To Catherine Bolzinger

World premiere : 23/05/2003 - Strasbourg, Palais du Rhin - Ensemble Vocal Féminin du Conservatoire de Strasbourg, dir. Catherine Bolzinger

Yet (2002)

20 musicians (10')

Commissioned by Ensemble Intercontemporain to Pascal Dusapin

World premiere : 29/09/2002 - Strasbourg, Musica Festival - Ensemble Intercontemporain; dir : Jonathan Nott

Full (2001)

four vibraphones, piano and eight amplified voices (15')

Commissioned by Les Percussions de Strasbourg
To Odile Charvet and the Ecole des Percussions de Strasbourg

World premiere : 20/01/2002 - Strasbourg, La Laiterie for the 40th birthday of Les Percussions de Strasbourg - Matthieu Chardon, Marcel Verrept, Christophe Landoz, Christophe Dietrich (vb) ; Anne-Cécile Litolf (pno), Choeur de chambre de Strasbourg; dir: Catherine Bolzinger

Ektra (2001)

solo flute (5')
To Olivier Class

World premiere: 16/06/2001 - Strasbourg, Cercle européen, Académie des Marches de l'Est - Olivier Class, flute

Dikha (2000–2001)

clarinet/bass clarinet and electronics (9'30)

Composed during the "Cursus de composition et d'informatique musicale" at the IRCAM
To Pierre Dutrieu

World premiere: 15/06/2002 - Paris, Agora Festival, Espace de Projection de l'IRCAM - Pierre Dutrieu, clarinet

Treis (2000)

violin, cello and piano (10')

Honorable mention at the Gaudeamus Festival 2001/First Prize Earplay 2002
To Rosalie Adolf, Anne-Cécile Litolf and Godefroy Vujicic

World premiere: 07/10/2000 - Strasbourg, Musica Festival - Rosalie Adolf (vn), Godefroy Vujicic (vc), Anne-Cécile Litolf (pno)

La Chute Du Rouge (2000)

clarinet, cello, vibraphone and piano (11')
To Ivan Fedele

World premiere : 11/05/2000 - Strasbourg, Oratoire du Temple-Neuf - Ensemble du Conservatoire de Strasbourg

Skiaï (1998–1999)

five instruments (8')
To Pierre-Yves Meugé

World premiere: 11/05/1999 - Strasbourg, Musée de l’Œuvre Notre-Dame - Ensemble du Conservatoire de Strasbourg

Strofa II (1998)

female voice, violin and piano (5'30)

World premiere: 11/05/2000 - Strasbourg, Oratoire du Temple-Neuf - Ensemble du Conservatoire de Strasbourg

Strofa IIb (1998–2000)

female voice, alto flute (+ flute in C) and piano (5'30)

World premiere : 02/07/00 - Wangen (67), Vieux Freihof - Aline Metzinger (voice), Olivier Class (fl), Christophe Bertrand (pno)

References

External links
Official Website
 

1981 births
2010 deaths
20th-century classical composers
20th-century French composers
21st-century classical composers
21st-century French composers
Contemporary classical composers
French classical composers
French male classical composers
20th-century French male musicians
21st-century French male musicians
2010 suicides